Mousata is a village in the municipal unit of Leivatho on the island of Cephalonia, Greece. It is situated between Mount Ainos and the Ionian Sea, at about  elevation. It is 2 km northwest of  Vlachata, 4 km east of Peratata and 12 km southeast of Argostoli. The road from Poros to Argostoli passes through the village. Mousata suffered great damage from the 1953 Ionian earthquake.

Historical population

See also

List of settlements in Cephalonia

References

Populated places in Cephalonia